Countess of Coventry may refer to:

Anne Coventry, Countess of Coventry (1691–1788)
Anne Coventry, Countess of Coventry (1673–1763)
Maria Coventry, Countess of Coventry  (1733–1760)